Kulundu is a village in the Batken Region of Kyrgyzstan. It is part of the Leylek District. Its population was 8,250 in 2021.

Population

References

Populated places in Batken Region